Apex Magazine, also previously known as Apex Digest, is an American horror and science fiction magazine. This subscription webzine, Apex Magazine, contains short fiction, reviews, and interviews. It has been nominated for several awards including the Hugo Award.

After an 8-month hiatus starting in 2019, the magazine returned on January 5, 2020 with issue 121 and transitioned to a bimonthly publication cycle.

About
The monthly magazine was edited by award-winning author Catherynne M. Valente from issues #15-29, Hugo Award-winning editor, Lynne M. Thomas, from issues #30-55, and Sigrid Ellis, from issues #56-67. The current editor is Jason Sizemore, starting with issue #68.

On June 25, 2009, it was announced that a print version of Apex Digest would be returning, this time utilizing print-on-demand technology. Upon return from its 2019 hiatus, Apex resumed digital-only publication.

The magazine promotes a Story of the Year which is voted on by readers and fans of the magazine. It also published poems until 2017.

Contributing writers
Authors published by Apex have included Neil Gaiman, Poppy Z Brite, Cherie Priest, Eugie Foster, Maurice Broaddus, Ben Bova, William F. Nolan, Sara King, Brian Keene and many others. Featured authors on Apex Online have included Steven Savile, Sara King, David Conyers and Lavie Tidhar.

Awards and honors
In 2012, the magazine was nominated for a Hugo Award. It was nominated again in 2013 and 2014. Fiction published in Apex has been nominated for the Nebula Award.   Poetry published in Apex has been nominated for the Rhysling Award.

Apex Publications
In 2006 Apex Digest announced a move to book publishing, beginning with the anthology Aegri Somnia (2006), edited by Jason Sizemore and Gill Ainsworth.  This book contains original work by the first twelve featured writers of Apex Online.

Apex Publications has since released a number of novels, nonfiction books and anthologies, including short story collections such as Let's Play White by Chesya Burke, anthologies such as Dark Faith edited by Jerry Gordon and Maurice Broaddus, and novels such as An Occupation of Angels by Lavie Tidhar.

References

External links
 
 Apex Publications

Science fiction magazines published in the United States
Online magazines published in the United States
Quarterly magazines published in the United States
Horror fiction magazines
Magazines established in 2005
Magazines published in Kentucky